The Four Books of Sentences is a book of theology written by Peter Lombard in the 12th century. It is a compendium of theology, written around 1150.

Origin and characteristics

A gloss might concern syntax or grammar, or it might be on some difficult point of doctrine. These glosses, however, were not continuous, rather being placed between the lines or in the margins of the biblical text itself. Lombard went a step further, collecting texts from various sources (such as scripture, Augustine of Hippo, and other Church Fathers) and compiling them into one coherent whole. In order to accomplish this, he had to address two tasks: first, that of devising an order for his material, because systematic theology had not yet been constituted as a discipline, and secondly, finding ways to reconcile doctrinal differences among his sources. Peter Abelard's  provided crucial inspiration for the latter tasks.

Lombard arranged his material from the Bible and the Church Fathers in four books, then subdivided this material further into chapters. Probably between 1223 and 1227, Alexander of Hales grouped the many chapters of the four books into a smaller number of "distinctions". In this form, the book was widely adopted as a theological textbook in the high and late Middle Ages (the 13th, 14th, and 15th centuries). A commentary on the Sentences was required of every master of theology, and was part of the examination system. At the end of lectures on Lombard's work, a student could apply for bachelor status within the theology faculty.

The importance of the Sentences to medieval theology and philosophy lies to a significant extent in the overall framework they provide to theological and philosophical discussion. All the great scholastic thinkers, such as Aquinas, William of Ockham, Bonaventure, Petrus Aureolus, Robert Holcot, and Duns Scotus, wrote commentaries on the Sentences. But these works were not exactly commentaries, for the Sentences was really a compilation of sources, and Lombard left many questions open, giving later scholars an opportunity to provide their own answers.

See also
 Minuscule 714 – the manuscript of the New Testament and of

Editions

Standard modern translation into English

Peter Lombard, The Sentences, Books 1–4. translator, Giulio Silano, 4 vols. (Toronto: Pontifical Institute of Mediaeval Studies, 2007-2010).  
 Book 1: The Mystery of the Trinity 
 Book 2: On Creation
 Book 3: On the Incarnation of the Word
 Book 4: On the Doctrine of Signs

Further reading
Elizabeth Frances Rogers, Peter Lombard and the Sacramental System (Merrick, NY: Richwood Pub. Co., 1976).
Philipp W. Rosemann, Peter Lombard (New York: Oxford University Press, 2004).
Philipp W. Rosemann, The Story of a Great Medieval Book: Peter Lombard's "Sentences" (Toronto: University of Toronto Press, 2007).

External links
 Les Sentences - Pierre LOMBARD - Magister Sententiarum
 Various commentaries, and a partial English translation of The Four Books of the Sentences itself
  Textus Sententiarum (Patrologie Latine, 192, col. 519-964)
  Textus Sententiarum: cum conclusionibus magistri Henrici Gorichem (1502 Edition, by Bavarian State Library digital)
  Libri Quattuor Sententiarum
  Page from the Logic Museum about the Book of Sentences.
  Scriptum super Sententiis by St. Thomas Aquinas (complete)

1150s books
12th-century Latin books
12th-century Christian texts
Medieval literature
Scholasticism
Christian theology books